is an anime television series produced by TMS Entertainment based on the series of short stories written and collected under the title  by Natsuhiko Kyogoku. The series was initially licensed in English by Geneon USA and now licensed by Discotek Media, and into a series of live action TV specials directed by Yukihiko Tsutsumi.

Plot
Taking place during the Bakumatsu of the Edo period when the foundations of the Tokugawa shogunate have begun to sway, a young writer named Momosuke wishes to write a book of 100 ghost stories.

While researching old myths and legends, he comes across a mysterious trio who call themselves the Ongyou. They are detectives who are investigating the legends to reveal their truths, and bring those in the wrong to justice. Each time Momosuke meets the Ongyou, he must face horrible truths and battle with his morals, and he's seeing things he shouldn't be seeing...

Characters
Momosuke Yamaoka
Voiced by (English): Grant George
Voiced by (Japanese): Toshihiko Seki
The main protagonist of the series. A young writer from Edo who got bored writing a riddle book for kids. He now aspires to write a book of 100 ghost stories. During his adventure to gather them, he encounters the Ongyou and witnesses their methods of imposing justice upon wrongdoers. He wishes to be one of the Ongyou, but each time he asks to join them they talk him out of it. He is called "Author" by the Ongyou. At the end of the series, Momosuke finishes his 100 ghost stories.

Tsutaya
Voiced by: Hiroshi Ōtake
A small creature who is Momosuke's publisher.

Heihachi
Voiced by: Kōji Tsujitani
Heihachi is a co-worker of Momosuke.

Kyogoku Tei
Voiced by: Natsuhiko Kyogoku
The principal antagonist of the series. Kyogoku Tei is a being who serves as the superior to the Ongyō as he provides them their targets and even commissioned Momosuke's death at first to cover their existence until he saw him to be of use to his scheme. Assuming the alias of feudal lord Danjo Kitabayashi, Kyogoku Tei commits many inhuman acts as part of an overall plan to cover the world in darkness with the Flame Lance cannon. He was ultimately defeated by the Ongyou and was devoured by the very darkness of everyone who he used.

Hermits
Voiced by: Masako Nozawa
Two strange hermit ladies that work for Kyogoku Tei, serving as his messengers. On occasion they will change themselves into two young girls to trick the Ongyou into doing what they want them to. They are accidentally destroyed by Kyogoku Tei in the last episode.

Tatsuta
Voiced by: Keiko Toda
Burning her childhood friend Shiragaku to death in a jealous rage with her husband to be, Tatsuta assumes her friend's name and developed a reputation as a rumored Hi-No-Enma as she kills anyone who "loves Shiragaku." She has evaded the Ongyou for a long time. Though the Ongyou attempt to deliver judgement, the Hermits intervene and take Tatsuta to serve under Kyogoku Tei. Unaware of the full plan, she helps him by orchestrating a massacre at Seven Man Point and forcing prisoners into becoming murderous sadists for a reenactment while the Flame Lance was being rebuilt. When Kyogoku Tei is destroyed, Tatsuta is consumed in the resulting inferno.

Ongyou
The Ongyou are three spiritual beings who are recurring characters in the show. They function as a team that punishes sinners who emit a dark aura about them, most frequently murderers. To that end, they use their talents to set their target up to face his/her crimes before being executed and committing them to the next world.

Mataichi
Voiced by: Ryūsei Nakao
A small cloaked man wrapped in bandages who serves as the leader of the Ongyou. He is a spiritualist who is also referred to as a trickster while posing as a simple monk. He would usually be the one to kill the target sinner with Retributive justice and leaves an Ofuda on the body so the departed can be "sent to the next world." Nagamimi commonly calls him "trickster". At the completion of his task, he uses the phrase "ongyō shitate matsuru (御行奉為、おんぎょうしたてまつる)." The beginning of every next episode preview, except the final episode when it's Momosuke's final line, he begins with the line, "Jyashin yashin wa yami ni chiri, nokoru wa chimata no ayashii uwasa (邪心野心は闇に散り、残るは巷の怪しい噂。)."

Ogin
Voiced by: Sanae Kobayashi
A beautiful, voluptuous and large breasted female puppeteer. She is often seen using a puppet in the form of a young girl with a white powdered face and red lipstick wearing a Japanese Kimono. Fifteen years prior, Ogin and her parents were murdered by Kinzo Sasamori, a corrupt official who posed as her father Giamon of Inarizika to force the homeless people to work for him and created the rumor of Giamon as a Kowai to ensure it. As a spirit, she became a member of Ongyou to ensure that no other child suffers a fate like her own like saving her childhood friend Yae from Kichibe's madness. She often calls Momosuke a pervert due to him accidentally walking into her in a bathing room when they first met. Though she saw Momosuke to be weak for being naive, she eventually adapted his methods.

Nagamimi
Voiced by: Norio Wakamoto
A large shapeshifter and bird caller who is also extremely good at controlling animals. As the anime states, he is over 200 years old and was versed in Kabuki. He would always be the one to try to keep Momosuke from intervening with the Ongyou's targets.

English translation
The Wicked and the Damned: A Hundred Tales of Karma (Kōsetsu Hyaku Monogatari)
"The Bean Washer" (original title: "Azukiarai"), trans. Ian M. MacDonald (Creek & River Co., Ltd, 2015)
"The Fox Priest" (original title: "Hakuzōsu"), trans. Ian M. MacDonald (Creek & River Co., Ltd, 2015)
"The Flying Heads" (original title: "Maikubi"), trans. Ian M. MacDonald (Creek & River Co., Ltd, 2015)
"Shibaemon the Raccoon-Dog" (original title: "Shibaemon Tanuki"), trans. Ian M. MacDonald (Creek & River Co., Ltd, 2016)
"Chojiro the Horse-Eater" (original title: "Shio no Choji"), trans. Ian M. MacDonald (Creek & River Co., Ltd, 2016)
"The Willow Woman" (original title: "Yanagi Onna"), trans. Ian M. MacDonald (Creek & River Co., Ltd, 2016)
"The Corpse at the Crossroads" (original title: "Katabira-ga-Tsuji"), trans. Ian M. MacDonald (Creek & River Co., Ltd, 2016)

Anime
The series was animated by TMS Entertainment and directed by Hideki Tonokatsu with Hiromichi Ōishi, Yuichi Murata, and Takeyuki Okazaki as producers, Yoshinobu Fujioka handling series composition, and Kuniaki Haishima composing the music. It aired from October 4 to December 26, 2003. The opening song "The Flame" and the ending song "The Moment of Love" were both performed by Keiko Lee.

References

External links
 The Wicked and the Damned: A Hundred Tales of Karma (short stories) at Japan Authors' gallery KAORI
 Requiem from the Darkness (anime) at Internet Movie Database
 

2003 anime television series debuts
Geneon USA
Horror anime and manga
Mystery anime and manga
Supernatural anime and manga
Japanese fantasy novels
TMS Entertainment
Discotek Media

ja:巷説百物語シリーズ